Carleton B. Swift Jr. was a U.S. Navy seaman, Office of Strategic Services (OSS) officer, and CIA officer between 1941 and 1974. Swift played a subordinate role to Archimedes Patti as part of the OSS team that met with Ho Chi Minh in September, 1945.

Early life
Carleton Byron Swift Jr. was born on 4 July 1919 in Portland, Oregon, and studied engineering at Harvard where he graduated in 1941.  He was the son of Carleton Byron Swift and his wife, Lila Leonard.  His father was a member of the Swift meat-packing family.

Career

World War II
After serving time in the Navy he joined the OSS and was sent to China where he was based in Kunming and monitored Japanese shipping. He was later assigned to monitor the situation in what would become North Vietnam and after the Atomic bombings of Hiroshima and Nagasaki he traveled with Archimedes Patti and Jean Sainteny to Hanoi. His and Patti's mission was to assist in the repatriation of allied prisoners of war which the U.S. government was concerned the Japanese might hurt following the Atomic bombings of Hiroshima and Nagasaki and secondly to gather intelligence.

During their time in Hanoi the OSS officers and their team met with Ho Chi Minh and although Swift did not speak French as Patti did he also met with Ho Chi Minh on at least one occasion. Swift denied that the U.S. could have been significant in creating the Viet Minh because the OSS had never had more than three 12-14 man commando teams operating in Indochina.

Swift and Patti both left Hanoi at the end of September, 1945 after the French alleged that the Americans had been fomenting a revolution there.

Work at the CIA
Swift served with the CIA in Seoul, Baghdad, Tokyo, London and The Hague before retiring in 1974.

Family
Swift was married and divorced three times and had six children.

Death
Swift died on January 24, 2012, at his home in Washington.

See also
Vietnam during World War II
Decolonisation of Asia
Imperialism in Asia
Vietnam War

References

United States Navy officers
1919 births
2012 deaths
People of the Office of Strategic Services
People of the Central Intelligence Agency
Military personnel from Portland, Oregon
Harvard School of Engineering and Applied Sciences alumni
American military personnel of World War II